In probability theory and statistics, diffusion processes are a class of continuous-time Markov process with almost surely continuous sample paths. Diffusion process is stochastic in nature and hence is used to model many real-life stochastic systems. Brownian motion, reflected Brownian motion and Ornstein–Uhlenbeck processes are examples of diffusion processes. It is used heavily in statistical physics, statistical analysis, information theory, data science, neural networks, finance and marketing.

A sample path of a diffusion process models the trajectory of a particle embedded in a flowing fluid and subjected to random displacements due to collisions with other particles, which is called Brownian motion.  The position of the particle is then random; its probability density function as a function of space and time is  governed by an advection–diffusion equation.

Mathematical definition 
A diffusion process is a Markov process with continuous sample paths for which the Kolmogorov forward equation is the Fokker–Planck equation.

See also 
Diffusion
Itô diffusion
Jump diffusion
Sample-continuous process

References 

Markov processes